Rajko is a masculine given name and may refer to:

Rajko Aleksić (born 1947), former Serbian football defender
Rajko Brežančić (born 1989), Serbian footballer
Rajko Ray Bogdanović (born 1979), Serbian engineer for information technologies
Rayko Daskalov (1886–1923), Bulgarian interwar politician of the Bulgarian Agrarian People's Union (BAPU)
Rajko Doleček (born 1925), Czech doctor and writer
Rajko Đurić (1947–2020), Serbian Romani writer and academic
Rajko Grlić (born 1947), Croatian film director and producer
Rajko Igić (born 1937), Serbian doctor and scientist
Rajko Janjanin (born 1957), former Serbian football player
Rajko Jokanović (born 1971), Serbian volleyball player
Rajko Kojić (1956–1997), Serbian and former Yugoslav guitarist, played with band Riblja Čorba
Rajko Kuzmanović (born 1931), Serb politician in Bosnia and Herzegovina
Rajko Lekić (born 1981), Danish footballer
Rajko Ljubič, Bačkan ethnic Croat film director from Subotica, Serbia
Rajko Magić (born 1955), Croatian football manager
Rajko Mitić (1922–2008), Serbian football player and coach
Rajko Mueller or Isolée, microhouse artist
Rajko Ostojić (born 1962), Croatian physician and politician
Rajko Pavlovec (born 1932), Slovene professor of geology, specialist in paleontology, stratigraphy, regional geology
Rajko Perušek (1854–1917), Slovene writer, translator, linguist and bibliographer
Rajko Pirnat (born 1951), Slovene politician, lawyer and professor, former Minister of Justice of Slovenia
Rajko Prodanović (born 1986), Serbian handballer
Rajko Ray Radović (born 1978), fitness record-holder, BBC Last Man Standing, songwriter
Rajko od Rasine (1413–1441), Serbian nobleman that had the title of Grand Čelnik
Rajko Rep (born 1990), Slovenian football midfielder
Rajko Tavčar (born 1974), Slovenian football player
Rajko Toroman (born 1955), Serbian professional basketball coach
Rajko Uršič (born 1981), Slovenian futsal player
Rajko Vujadinović (born 1956), retired footballer
Rayko Zhinzifov (1839–1877), Bulgarian National Revival poet and translator
Rajko Žižić (1955–2003), Montenegrin basketball player from Milojevići, Nikšić

See also
Rajković
Rajkoviće
Rajkovac (disambiguation)
Rajkowo
Rajkowy

Slavic masculine given names
Bulgarian masculine given names
Serbian masculine given names